Hannu Juhani "Hanski" Rantakari (8 January 1939 – 1 January 2018) was a Finnish gymnast. He competed at the 1964 and 1968 Summer Olympics in all artistic gymnastics events and won a bronze medal in the vault in 1964. His best individual result in other events was 26th place on floor in 1964.

Between 1963 and 1967 Rantakari won six national titles. He was chosen as Finnish Workers' Sports Federation (TUL) best athlete of the year in 1961 and 1964. He was ranked 14th in 1964 and 20th in 1965 in the world gymnastics ranking.

References

1939 births
2018 deaths
Finnish male artistic gymnasts
Gymnasts at the 1964 Summer Olympics
Gymnasts at the 1968 Summer Olympics
Olympic gymnasts of Finland
Olympic bronze medalists for Finland
Olympic medalists in gymnastics
Gymnasts from Tampere
Medalists at the 1964 Summer Olympics